Marvin Wijks (born 11 May 1984) is a Dutch footballer who currently plays for VVSB in the Tweede Divisie.

Career
Wijks, born in Paramaribo, Suriname, never played for an amateur team in his youth. He made his professional debut for Sparta Rotterdam in the Eredivisie on 4 December 2005 in the home match against ADO Den Haag, which Sparta lost 2–3. That was the only match he played for Sparta. He played for HFC Haarlem from 2006 to 2010. On 29 September 2006 he scored his first career goal for Haarlem in the away game against AGOVV Apeldoorn that Haarlem won 3–2 (Wijks scored the 3–1 in the 70th minute).

References

External links
 
 

1984 births
Living people
Sportspeople from Paramaribo
Dutch footballers
Eredivisie players
Eerste Divisie players
Derde Divisie players
Association football forwards
Sparta Rotterdam players
HFC Haarlem players
1. FC Magdeburg players
VfB Germania Halberstadt players
FC Emmen players
Dutch expatriate footballers
Dutch sportspeople of Surinamese descent
Expatriate footballers in Germany
VVSB players